"I'm Cool" is the first single from Anthony Hamilton's fourth studio album The Point of It All featuring American rapper David Banner. The song was composed by Hamilton, Banner, and Kelvin Wooten. It was released in 2008.

Critical reception

The critical reception to the song has been mixed; it was not seen as one of the better tracks of the album. Mike Joseph of Pop Matters wrote "it’s far from the best song on the album (actually, it‘s one of the weakest)". However, reviews have shown favor to the song. Edward Bowser of Soul in Stereo wrote "David Banner’s disgusting rap... can’t even slow this down".

Joseph also wrote “Cool” ... turns out to be a pretty decent song, a mellow midtempo track with a fairly unobtrusive (and witty) rap section from Banner. Andy Kellman of AllMusic also gave it a favorable review saying it "parlays the stress of financial strain into a good time without resembling mindless escapism."

Charts

Weekly charts

Year-end charts

References

External links
 Cool Lyrics

2008 singles
Anthony Hamilton (musician) songs
2008 songs
Songs written by Anthony Hamilton (musician)
Songs written by David Banner